The following lists events that happened during 1952 in Chile.

Incumbents
President of Chile: Gabriel González Videla (until 3 November), Carlos Ibáñez del Campo

Events

January 
 3 January – Election violence begins in Chile when supporters of del Campo threw tear gas bombs into a theater where right-wing candidate Arturo Matte was addressing a meeting.
 13 January – Foreign Minister Cristiano E. Irrarrazaval resigns.
26 January - The Paipote foundry is inaugurated, located in the Atacama Region

April
24 April - The National Statistics Institute (INE) carries out the XII National Population Census and the I Housing Census.

August 
18 August - Alberto Hurtado SJ dies, priest of the Society of Jesus, apostle of Catholic trade unionism and charitable works, leader of Chilean Catholic Action, first doctor in Education, lecturer and author of numerous books, founder, among others, of the Faculty of Theology of the Pontifical Catholic University of Chile, of the Chilean Trade Union Action (ASICH), of the Revista Mensaje and of the Hogar de Cristo. Alberto Hurtado was canonized on October 23, 2005 by Benedict XVI.

September
4 September – Chilean presidential election, 1952

December
31 December - The first Trolleybuses in Valparaíso is inaugurated, a transportation system that continues to this day.

Births
9 February – Gunther Uhlmann
21 April – Jorge Pizarro
10 October – Miguel Ángel Neira
21 November – Pedro Lemebel (d. 2015)
4 December – Álvaro Fillol
27 December – Álvaro Salas

Deaths
18 August  – Alberto Hurtado (b. 1901)

References 

 
Years of the 20th century in Chile
Chile